Lorraine Loots is a South African artist and miniaturist from Cape Town. She has created miniature depictions of circular landscapes and everyday objects on a white background. Lorraine first rose to notoriety during 2013 when she began a project called 365 Paintings for ants and later in 2014 with 365 Postcards for ants where she painted one painting every day of the year and posted it on social media platforms for two consecutive years. This project gained her much media attention where she was featured on CBS, CNN, Charlie Rose, Huffington Post and Colossal to name a few.

References

South African women artists
Year of birth missing (living people)
Living people
Artists from Cape Town